Paul Cohen (1934–2007) was an American mathematician, winner of the Fields Medal.

Paul Cohen may also refer to:

Paul Cohen (record producer) (1908–1970), American country music producer
Paul Cohen (historian) (born 1934), American historian of China
Paul Cohen (designer) (born 1962), Australian industrial designer
Paul Robert Cohen (born c. 1949), appellant in the 1971 U.S. Supreme Court case Cohen v. California
Paul Cohen (saxophonist) (born c. 1950), American saxophonist and music teacher
 (born 1957), Dutch film director and cinematographer
Paul Cohen (ice hockey) (born 1965), Canadian former professional ice hockey goaltender
Paul S. Cohen (born 1941), American linguist

See also
Paul Cohn (1924–2006), German-born professor of mathematics at University College, London